Commander Herbert Roff Newton OBE DL JP (1900-1973), was a senior officer in the Royal Navy, a Deputy Lieutenant for Bedfordshire and for many years a Justice of the Peace.

Life
Herbert Roff Newton was born in Bedford on 10 July 1900, the son of William Lea Newton and Nellie (née Roff). He was educated at Bedford Modern School

After a period of service in the Artists Rifles, Newton joined the Royal Navy.  He was made a Commander in 1946 and, in the same year, was invested as an Officer of the Order of the British Empire.  Newton served on several governmental committees and was made Deputy Lieutenant of Bedfordshire in 1961.  He was for many years a Justice of the Peace. A keen rugby player, and later a referee, he appeared occasionally for Bedford between 1923 and 1926.

Newton died in Bedford on 2 June 1973.  He was survived by his wife, Edith, and a daughter.

References

Deputy Lieutenants of Bedfordshire
Officers of the Order of the British Empire
Royal Navy officers
1900 births
People educated at Bedford Modern School
1973 deaths
Bedford Blues players